Psycho Savant is the third and final studio album by the metal band Intruder. It was released in June, 1991, on Metal Blade and Warner Bros. Records. The album moved toward slower tempos and longer songs (all but one of the songs are over 6 minutes in length). It was also their only album Tom Harding did not produce.

"N.G.R.I." stands for "Not Guilty for Reason of Insanity."

In the song "Geri's Lament (When)", the word 'Geri's' is short for 'geriatrics'. The song deals with the abuse of the elderly at senior care living facilities. The song was lauded for spreading awareness on a then relatively unknown problem.

Track listing
"Face of Hate" - 06:12
"Geri's Lament (When)" - 07:33
"The Enemy Within" - 06:57
"It's a Good Life" - 07:39	
"Invisible" - 06:46
"Traitor to the Living" - 07:51
"Final Word" - 04:31
"N.G.R.I." - 06:44

Personnel
 Jimmy Hamilton - vocals
 Arthur Vinett - guitar
 Greg Messick - guitar
 Todd Nelson - bass
 John Pieroni - drums
Production
 Bill Metoyer - recording and mixing
 Rich Larson, Steve Fastner - cover art

References

1991 albums
Intruder (American band) albums